Angelica Ott (born 1944) is a former German film actress. She was married to the film producer Karl Spiehs and most of her performances were in films made by his company Lisa Film.

Selected filmography
 Blood at Sundown (1966)
 Dollar of Fire (1966)
 Hot Pavements of Cologne (1967)
 The Seven Red Berets (1969)
 Help, I Love Twins (1969)
 When You're With Me (1970)
 Hotel by the Hour (1970)
 Aunt Trude from Buxtehude (1971)
 Rudi, Behave! (1971)
 Cry of the Black Wolves (1972)
 Crazy – Completely Mad (1973)
 The Bloody Vultures of Alaska (1973)

References

Bibliography 
 Peter Cowie & Derek Elley. World Filmography: 1967. Fairleigh Dickinson University Press, 1977.

External links 
 

1944 births
Living people
German film actresses
People from Świebodzin